Three referendums were held in Liechtenstein during 1988. The first two were held on 24 January and concerned increasing the number of members of the Landtag from 15 to 25 and a plan for company pensions. Both were approved by 51.7% of voters. The third was held on 2 October on the construction of the Gnalp-Steg tunnel and was approved by 55.1% of voters.

Results

Increasing the number of Landtag members from 15 to 25

Company pension plan

Construction of the Gnalp-Steg tunnel

References

1988 referendums
1988 in Liechtenstein
1988
Pension referendums